The Fehérvár Enthroners established in 2007 are an American football team from Székesfehérvár, Hungary. The Enthroners are competing in the Hungarian Football League. The team starts in the 2023 season in the European League of Football (ELF).

History
After establishing in 2007, the team participated in the lowest league without noticeable success until 2015, reaching play-off for the first time.

In 2016 a new football program started: the team moved to First Field, the first Hungarian American football stadium, and finished runners-up in tier 3, promoted into tier 2. In 2017 the Enthroners won Division I undefeated, and since then they participate in the HFL. I 2018 they finished in the 5th place, but in 2019, after finishing 3rd place in the regular season, they won Hungarian Bowl XIV. In 2021 they lost the final after an undefeated regular season, but in 2022 they won the HFL undefeated.

Since 2018 the Enthroners are participating in the Austrian lower leagues. By the rules they had to compete in Divisions 4, 3 and 2, before promoting to Division 1 (second highest division in Austria). Despite the winning lower divisions the Austrian Federation did not allowed to skip any divisions, so Enthroners had to play in all 4 lower tiers. As the since 2022 the Austrian Federation does not allow to promote teams into top level AFL to stabilize the 10 participating teams' positions, Enthroners were not allowed to play in the top division.

In 2021 they entered the Central European Football League, but because of the Covid-related travel issues the Calanda Broncos won the match without playing.

In 2022 the team participated in the CEFL Cup, won the Southern group and entered the final against Prague Lions. With a 24:20 victory on their home field they won the title.

On May 13, 2022, during a press conference in was announced than the Enthroners will enter the European League of Football in 2023.

Season summary

Hungarian championship 

 WC = Wild card
 SF = Semi finals
 HB = Hungarian Bowl
 PB = Pannon Bowl
 DB = Duna Bowl

Austrian championship 

 SF = Semi finals
 MB = Mission Bowl
 CB = Challenge Bowl
 IB = Iron Bowl
 SB = Silver Bowl

International 

 QF = Quarter finals
 F = Final

Roster

Staff

See also
Hungarian American Football League
Austrian Football League
Central European Football League

References

External links
 Magyarországi Amerikai Futball Csapatok Szövetsége
 American Football Bund Österreich
 Central European Football League
 Fehérvár Enthroners Official Homepage

American football teams in Hungary
Sport in Székesfehérvár
2007 establishments in Hungary
American football teams established in 2007
European League of Football teams